Beli II (died 722) was a king of Alt Clut, the Brittonic kingdom later known as Strathclyde, for some period in the early 8th century.

According to the Harleian genealogies, he was the son of Elfin, one of his predecessors as king. The same genealogy makes him father to Teudebur, his probable successor on the throne. His obituary is noted in the Brut y Tywysogion and the Annals of Ulster under the year 722.

References

 MacQuarrie, Alan, "The Kings of Strathclyde", in A. Grant & K.Stringer (eds.) Medieval Scotland: Crown, Lordship and Community, Essays Presented to G.W.S. Barrow, (Edinburgh, 1993), pp. 1–19

External links
 Annals of Ulster
 Harleian genealogy 5

722 deaths
Monarchs of Strathclyde
8th-century Scottish monarchs
Year of birth unknown